Kamionki  is a village in the administrative district of Gmina Kórnik, situated in Poznań County, Greater Poland Voivodeship, in west-central Poland.

As of 2022, the village has a population of 5,830.

Highly controversial powerline
South of Kamionki in 1958 a 220 kV-powerline with a single circuit was built. In 2006 this line was replaced by a new powerline with 4 circuits, 2 for 380 kV and 2 for 220 kV. Although Kamionki grew in the meantime, this line was built through a settlement and above a road, which resulted in protests as a right of way for a powerline running around Kamionki was available, but this was not done for saving money. Today there are no signs of protest, as the population moved on from the issue.

References

External links
 http://kamionki.net/index.html

Kamionki